The Denison-Crockett Expedition (1937–1938) was a scientific expedition organized by Charis Denison Crockett and her husband Frederick Crockett for the Academy of Natural Sciences of Philadelphia.

In 1934 Charis Denison graduated magna cum laude with a bachelor's degree in anthropology from Radcliffe. She married Frederick E. Crockett, M.D., who had been a dog driver on Admiral Byrd's 1928–30 Antarctican expedition. Charis Crockett persuaded her husband to become a photographer on a small expedition to New Guinea, where she would do anthropological research. (In the 1930s, western New Guinea, the ultimate destination of the expedition, was part of the Dutch East Indies.) The Academy of Natural Sciences of Philadelphia sponsored the expedition, which had as members the newly married Crocketts and five other Americans. S. Dillon Ripley was the expedition's zoologist. Besides the Crocketts and Ripley the expedition members were three men, namely the captain (and navigator), a cook, and a sailor, and one woman, "Diddy" Lowndes, who was a friend of Charis Crockett's. The expedition departed from Gloucester, Massachusetts aboard the schooner Chiva, which was owned by the Crocketts. The expedition arrived in October 1937 at Sorong and the Crocketts lived in a house on stilts at the village of Sainke Doek, which was inland from Sorong and served as a station for the sago trade. Charis Crockett wrote a popular book The House in the Rain Forest about their experiences.

The expedition collected 121 fish specimens from 7 locations, most of them in New Guniea; there were 67 species, one of which was new with an allegedly new genus. Fowler named the new species Charisella fredericki but contemporary research rejects the alleged genus Charisella in favor of Melanotaenia. On the island of Biak, Ripley collected 3 specimens of a new subspecies of flying phalanger.

Ripley collected over 300 specimens of birds from Biak, representing most of the island's endemic species. The expedition collected specimens of birds from the Kepuluan Penyu (Schildpad Islands), Misool (Batanme), Salawati and Batanta.

The expedition lasted about 18 months, ending with the return of Ripley and his many specimens to the United States in July 1938.

Ripley gave an account of the expedition in his popular book Trail of the Money Bird.

References

External links
S. Dillon Ripley in New Guinea, Smithsonian Institution Archives

Pacific expeditions
Expeditions from the United States
1937 in Oceania
1938 in Oceania